The 1997 WPA World Nine-ball Championship was a professional pool championship that took place in 1997 in Chicago, United States. The event was won by Johnny Archer, who defeated Kun-Fang Lee in the final 9–3. Defending champion Ralf Souquet was defeated in the semifinals 9-8 by Lee.

Tournament Summary
Johnny Archer would win his second world nine-ball championship, after previously winning the event in 1992.

Knockout stages
The following is the results from the knockout stages. Players competing had progressed through the earlier knockout round. All matches were played as race to 13 racks.

References

External links
 event at Propool.info

1997
WPA World Nine-ball Championship
WPA World Nine-ball Championship
International sports competitions hosted by the United States